The Doughnut in Granny's Greenhouse is the second album by the British comedy rock group Bonzo Dog Doo-Dah Band. In the United States, it was released as Urban Spaceman and added their U.K. hit single "I'm the Urban Spaceman" to the track listing.

Background
By 1968, the group's sound had expanded beyond their music hall and jazz roots, drawing inspiration from the blues and psychedelic rock movements that had grown in popularity at the time. They recorded the album at the newly-established Morgan Studios in London. The phrase "the doughnut in granny's greenhouse" is obscure British slang for the lavatory. The band first heard it when Michael Palin told them a joke featuring it.

The chorus of "We Are Normal" features the lyric "We are normal and we want our freedom", a reference to a line from the 1963 play The Persecution and Assassination of Jean-Paul Marat as Performed by the Inmates of the Asylum of Charenton Under the Direction of the Marquis de Sade or Marat/Sade a line also quoted in "The Red Telephone", a song by the American band Love from their 1967 album Forever Changes. The track also features the playful rhyming interjection  "We are normal and we dig* Bert Weedon" in which Stanshall pays fleeting tribute to one of the most influential guitarists of his day.

[* Note: the African-American English homonym of the English word 'dig', used here, may derive either from the Wolof dëgg or dëgga or the Irish tuig -  both meaning "to understand/appreciate"]

The track 11 Moustachioed Daughters is a darkly comic (and remarkably detailed) evocation of the traditional Witches' Sabbath and features lyrics referencing the traditional hallucinogenic
flying ointment prepared from Atropa belladonna (and other Solanaceous plants - including the fabled mandrake, said to shriek when uprooted).  Stylistically, the track is also a heartfelt homage to the original 1963 recording "The Feast of the Mau-Mau", by one of Vivian Stanshall's favourite musical artists Screamin' Jay Hawkins ("Feast of the Mau Mau" is a number which Hawkins himself would later re-release in a more widely known 'live' version on his 1969 LP ...What That Is!).

In 2007 the U.K. version of "Doughnut" was re-issued by EMI on CD with 5 bonus rare and/or unreleased tracks.

Sleeve notes

The instruction that "The noises of your bodies are a part of this record." can be found on the booklet that came with the gatefold edition.

Track listing

References

External links
 [ Allmusic]

1968 albums
Bonzo Dog Doo-Dah Band albums
Albums produced by Gus Dudgeon
Albums produced by Gerry Bron
Liberty Records albums
Imperial Records albums
Albums recorded at Morgan Sound Studios